Fears is a 1980 Argentine horror film directed by Alejandro Doria.

References

External links 
 

1980 films
Argentine horror films
1980s Spanish-language films
Films directed by Alejandro Doria
1980s Argentine films